Palur  is a village in the Srirangam taluk of Tiruchirappalli district in Tamil Nadu, India.

Demographics 

As per the 2001 census, Palur had a population of 1,406 with 695 males and 711 females. The sex ratio was 1023 and the literacy rate, 78.57.

References 

 

Villages in Tiruchirappalli district